Roady's Truck Stops is the largest group of independently owned truck stops in the United States.  As of February 2023, 316 locations are in operation in the United States.  It is headquartered in Meridian, Idaho.

Roady's Truck Stops is a chain of truck stops and travel centers that provide fuel, food, and other services to truck drivers and travelers across the United States.

Its facilities are designed to meet the needs of truck drivers, with amenities such as diesel fuel, parking for large vehicles, showers, laundry facilities, and restaurants.

In addition to its traditional truck stop services, Roady's also provides a range of other services for truckers, including tire repair, oil changes, and other maintenance services. The company also offers a loyalty program called Roady's Rewards, which allows drivers to earn points for purchases and redeem them for merchandise or services.

History
Roady's Truck Stops was founded January 1, 2007, when two trucking industry marketing groups merged. Great Savings Network and TruckStops Direct combined, creating the largest truck stop chain in North America.  Great Savings Network was a marketing group that worked with independent truck stops.  TruckStops Direct was established in 1994 to strengthen the relationship between truck stops and trucking companies.  The Roady's Truck Stop network allows independent truck stop facilities to leverage corporate buying power to get maximum return.

The founders are Scott Moscrip and Kelly Rhinehart. Both are now retired.

Humanitarian Bowl
In 2007, Roady's Truck Stops agreed to become the corporate sponsor for the Humanitarian Bowl, which is played in Boise at Bronco Stadium on the Boise State University campus. They sponsored the game for three years until their affiliate company UDrove took over title sponsorship for the 2010 game.

References

External links
 Roady's Truck Stops Official site

See also
 List of companies based in Idaho

Truck stop chains
Restaurants in Idaho
Companies based in Boise, Idaho
Gas stations in the United States
American companies established in 2007
Retail companies established in 2007
Restaurants established in 2007
Convenience stores of the United States